Pat Canavan (born  1960) is a former Gaelic footballer who played for the Dublin county team. Canavan won an all-Ireland medal for Dublin in 1983 in the final against Galway.

External links
Article on the Summer of 83'

1960 births
Living people
Dublin inter-county Gaelic footballers
Gaelic football backs
St Vincents (Dublin) Gaelic footballers
Winners of one All-Ireland medal (Gaelic football)
People educated at St. Joseph's CBS, Fairview